Shahrak-e Malek-e Ashtar (also Romanized as Shahrak-e Mālek-e Ashtar; also known as Mālek-e Ashtar) is a village in Seydun-e Shomali Rural District, Seydun District, Bagh-e Malek County, Khuzestan Province, Iran. At the 2006 census, its population was 174, in 34 families.

References 

Populated places in Bagh-e Malek County